Kendalrejo is a village in the town of Petarukan, Pemalang Regency, Central Java Province, Indonesia. This villages has an area of 4,14 km² and a population of 8,263 inhabitants in 2019.

References

External links
 Pemalang Regency Official Website
 BPS Kabupaten Pemalang

Villages in Central Java